The 2008 Cork Senior Hurling Championship was the 120th staging of the Cork Senior Hurling Championship since its establishment by the Cork County Board in 1887. The draw for the 2017 fixtures took place at the County Convention in December 2007. The championship began on 3 May 2008 and ended on 28 September 2008.

Erin's Own were the defending champions, however, they were defeated by Bride Rovers in the semi-final.

On 16 August 2008, St. Catherine's were relegated from the championship following a 1-10 to 1-12 defeat by Carrigtwohill.

On 28 September 2008, Sarsfields won the championship following a 2-14 to 2-13 defeat of Bride Rovers in the final. This was their third championship title overall and their first in 51 championship seasons.

Glen Rovers's Patrick Horgan was the championship's top scorer with 1-43.

Team changes

To Championship

Promoted from the Cork Premier Intermediate Hurling Championship
 Carrigtwohill

From Championship

Relegated from the Cork Senior Hurling Championship
 Douglas

Results

Divisional/colleges section

Round 1

Round 2

Round 3

Relegation play-offs

Quarter-finals

Semi-finals

Final

Championship statistics

Scoring
Widest winning margin: 19 points
UCC 3-22 : 1-9 Carbery (Divisional draw)
Most goals in a match: 5
Most points in a match: 44 
UCC 2-24 : 1-20 Imokilly (Round Three replay)
Most goals by one team in a match: 4
Seandún 4-4 : 1-24 CIT (Divisional draw)
Most goals scored by a losing team: 4
Seandún 4-4 : 1-24 CIT (Divisional draw)
Most points scored by a losing team: 23 
Imokilly 1-20 : 2-24 UCC (Round Three replay)

Top scorers

Top scorers overall

Top scorers in a single game

Miscellaneous

 Sarsfields won the championship for the first time since 1957
 Bride Rovers qualify for the final for the first time.

External links

2008 Cork SHC results

References

Cork Senior Hurling Championship
Cork Senior Hurling Championship